Year 1164 (MCLXIV) was a leap year starting on Wednesday (link will display the full calendar) of the Julian calendar.

Events 
 By place 

 Europe 
 Battle of Renfrew: A Norse-Gaelic army led by Lord Somerled, ruler of the Isles, invades Scotland and is routed by the Scottish forces under the command of Walter fitz Alan and Herbert of Selkirk, bishop of Glasgow.  

 England 
 January 30 – King Henry II tries to delimit spiritual and royal jurisdictions in the Constitutions of Clarendon, written in large part by his councilor Richard de Luci. 
 November 2 – Thomas Becket, having contended with Henry II over the power of secular courts, is found guilty of contempt of court, and exiled to France.

 Levant 
 Spring – Saladin accompanies his uncle, General Shirkuh, with an army sent to the Fatimid Caliphate (modern Egypt) by Nur al-Din, ruler (atabeg) of Syria.
 August 12 – Battle of Harim: Zangid forces under Nur al-Din defeat and capture Bohemond III of Antioch, Raymond of Tripoli, and Hugh of Lusignan.

 Africa 
 A commercial treaty grants access to Almohad-dominated ports to merchants from several European powers, including Marseille and Savona.

 Asia 
 September 14 – Emperor Sutoku dies in Sanuki Province (on the island of Shikoku), having lived in exile from the capital at Kyoto (since 1156).

 By topic 

 Markets 
 Venice secures its loans against fiscal revenues, to obtain lower interest rates. In the first operation of this kind, the Republic obtains 1150 silver marci, for 12 years of the taxes levied on the Rialto market.

 Religion 
 April 20 – Antipope Victor IV dies at Rome and is succeeded by Paschal III , who has gained election through the influence of Archchancellor Rainald of Dassel.
 August 5 – Uppsala is recognized as the seat of the Swedish metropolitan, with the coronation of its first archbishop Stefan, by Pope Alexander III.
 King Olaf II of Norway is canonized as Saint Olaf by Alexander III, making him a universally recognised saint of the Catholic Church.
 Rainald of Dassel brings relics of the Three Magi, from Milan to Cologne as a gift for Emperor Frederick I (Barbarossa).

Births 
 July 16 – Frederick V, son of Frederick I (Barbarossa)
 December 28 – Rokujō, emperor of Japan (d. 1176)
 Fulk of Pavia, Italian prelate and bishop (d. 1229)
 Hatakeyama Shigetada, Japanese samurai (d. 1205)
 Ibn Tumlus, Moorish scholar and physician (d. 1223)
 Isabel de Bolebec, English noblewoman (d. 1245)
 Shi Miyuan, Chinese official and politician (d. 1233)

Deaths 
 January 30 – William of Anjou, viscount of Dieppe (b. 1136)
 March 13 – Fujiwara no Tadamichi, Japanese regent (b. 1097)
 April 20 – Victor IV, antipope of Rome (b. 1095)
 May 16 – Héloïse, French scholar and abbess
 May 19 – Bashnouna, Egyptian monk and martyr
 June 18 – Elisabeth of Schönau, German abbess
 September 4 – Henry II, prince-bishop of Liège
 September 14 – Sutoku, emperor of Japan (b. 1119)
 November 11 – Hugh of Amiens, French archbishop
 December 23 – Hartmann of Brixen, German bishop (b. 1090)
 December 31 – Ottokar III, margrave of Styria (b. 1124)
 Herbert of Selkirk, Scottish bishop and chancellor
 Hodierna of Jerusalem, countess of Tripoli (b. 1110)
 Ortlieb of Zwiefalten, German Benedictine abbot
 Zhang Jun, Chinese grand chancellor (b. 1097)

References